Nicholas Anderson (October 22, 1856 – December 5, 1919) was an American businessman, farmer, and politician.

Born in the town of Albion, Dane County, Wisconsin, Anderson was educated at the Albion Academy. He was a farmer and was involved with the insurance business. He served on the Albion Town Board. In 1899, Anderson served in the Wisconsin State Assembly as a Republican. He then lived in Stoughton, Wisconsin and served on the Stoughton Common Council. He died in Stoughton, Wisconsin.

Notes

1856 births
1919 deaths
People from Albion, Dane County, Wisconsin
Businesspeople from Wisconsin
Farmers from Wisconsin
Wisconsin city council members
Members of the Wisconsin State Assembly
19th-century American politicians